Robert, Rob, Bob or Bobby Walker may refer to:

Entertainment
Robert Walker (actor, born 1888) (1888–1954) American actor 
Robert Walker (actor, born 1918) (1918–1951), actor in Strangers on a Train (1951)
Robert Walker (actor, born 1940) (1940–2019), actor in Ensign Pulver and Easy Rider
Robert Walker (animator) (1961–2015), Disney animator who directed Brother Bear
Robert Walker (painter) (1599–1658), English portrait painter
Robert Walker (musician) (1937–2017), American blues guitarist
Robert Walker (composer) (born 1946), English composer and broadcaster
Bob Walker (photographer) (1952–1992), American photographer and environmental activist
Rob Walker (poet) (born 1953), Australian poet
Bob Walker (artist), English artist

Politics
Robert Walker (MP) (1597–1673), English merchant and Royalist during the English Civil War
Robert Walker, Baron Walker of Gestingthorpe (born 1938), British law lord and Lord of Appeal in Ordinary
Robert F. Walker (1850–1930), Missouri Attorney General and justice of the Missouri Supreme Court
Robert J. Walker (1801–1869), Mississippi Senator, U.S. Treasury Secretary under President Polk
Robert Jarvis Cochran Walker (1838–1903), Congressman from Pennsylvania
Robert Walker (Canadian politician) (1916–1989), Saskatchewan lawyer and Attorney General
Robert Smith Walker (born 1942), member of the Congress of the United States from Pennsylvania

Religion
Robert Walker (priest, of Seathwaite) (1709–1802), Church of England clergyman in the Lake District
Robert Walker (moderator) (1716–1783), Church of Scotland minister and historian
Robert Walker (minister) (1755–1808), minister in the Church of Scotland
Robert Francis Walker (1789–1854), English cleric and translator 
Robert Walker (Archdeacon of Peterborough) (fl. 1956–1962), Canadian Anglican priest

Sports
Bob Walker (footballer, born 1942), English footballer
Bob Walker (footballer, born 1891) (1891–1965), Australian footballer for Essendon
Bob Walker (footballer, born 1912) (1912–1997), Australian footballer for Geelong
Bobby Walker (Australian footballer) (1900–1971), Australian footballer for Fitzroy
Bobby Walker (footballer, born 1879) (1879–1930), Scottish international footballer
Bobby Walker (footballer, born 1906) (1906–?), Scottish footballer in Scotland and the United States
Bobby Walker (golfer) (1943–1995), Scottish golfer
Robert Walker (American football) (born 1972), American former college football running back
Robert Walker (Australian footballer) (born 1970), former Australian rules footballer
Robert Walker (Newton Heath footballer) (fl. 1898–99), English footballer for Newton Heath
Robert Walker (footballer, born 1884) (1884–late 1940s), English footballer
Robert Walker (footballer, born 1903), English footballer for Bradford City
Robert Walker (footballer, born 1922) (1922–1991), Scottish footballer for Bournemouth and Wrexham
Robert Walker (footballer, born 1982), Scottish footballer for Hamilton
Robert Walker (Swedish footballer) (born 1987), Swedish footballer for Örebro
Robert Walker (Third Lanark footballer), one of the first black Scottish footballers
Robert Walker (rower) (born 1973), Australian Olympian rower.
R. T. Walker (Robert Taylor Walker, 1914–?), American baseball player
Bobby Walker (wrestler), professional wrestler

Other
Robert Sandilands Frowd Walker (1850–1917), British soldier and colonial officer in Malaya
Robert Barrie Walker (1878–1961), British trade unionist
Robert M. Walker (physicist) (1929–2004), American physicist and planetary scientist
Robert Walker (sailor) (1929–2016), United States Navy
Robert M. Walker (born 1949), United States Under Secretary of the Army, 1997–1998
Robert Bruce Napoleon Walker, English trader, explorer and collector of zoological specimens
R. B. J. Walker, Canadian International Relations theorist

See also
Rob Walker (disambiguation)
Robert Matthew-Walker (born 1939), English writer and composer
Bert Walker (disambiguation)
Walker (surname)